The Mask is a 1994 American superhero comedy film directed by Chuck Russell and produced by Bob Engelman from a screenplay by Mike Werb and a story by Michael Fallon and Mark Verheiden loosely based on the comics published by Dark Horse Comics. The first installment in The Mask franchise, it stars Jim Carrey in the title role, alongside Peter Riegert, Peter Greene, Amy Yasbeck, Richard Jeni and Cameron Diaz in her film debut. Carrey plays Stanley Ipkiss, a hapless, everyday bank clerk who finds a magical wooden green mask that transforms him into The Mask, a green-faced troublemaker with the ability to animate and alter himself and his surroundings at will. He starts using these powers mischievously, only to become targeted by Dorian Tyrell, a gangster who desires to overthrow his superior. Filming began on 30 August 1993 and concluded in October 1993.

The film was released on July 29, 1994, by New Line Cinema, becoming a critical and commercial success. The film grossed over $351 million on a $18–23 million budget, which made it the most-profitable film based on a comic up to that point. The film also influenced the resurgence of swing music in the 1990s. It cemented Carrey's reputation as a significant actor of the 1990s, and it established Diaz as a leading lady. Carrey was nominated for a Golden Globe for his role, and the film was nominated for the Academy Award for Best Visual Effects but lost to Forrest Gump. A standalone sequel, Son of the Mask, was released in 2005 to a critical and box office bomb.

Plot

In Edge City, insecure bank clerk Stanley Ipkiss is frequently ridiculed by everyone except for his co-worker and best friend, Charlie Schumaker. Meanwhile, gangster Dorian Tyrell, who runs the Coco Bongo nightclub, plots to overthrow his superior, Niko. One day, Tyrell sends his dazzling singer-girlfriend, Tina Carlyle, into the bank to record its layout for an upcoming robbery. Stanley is attracted to Tina, and she seemingly reciprocates.

After being denied entrance to the Coco Bongo to watch Tina perform, Stanley's faulty loaner car breaks down during his drive home. While looking over the harbor bridge in despair, he tries rescuing a humanoid figure in the waters but finds it to be a pile of garbage concealing a wooden mask. Upon returning to his apartment and donning the mask, he transforms into a green-faced, zoot-suited trickster known as "The Mask", who can animate and alter himself and his surroundings at will. With newfound confidence, Stanley indulges in a chaotic rampage through the city, humiliating several of his tormentors, including his temperamental landlady, Agnes Peenman, and assaulting the mechanics who gave him the faulty car.

The next morning, Stanley encounters detective Lieutenant Mitch Kellaway and newspaper reporter Peggy Brandt, both of whom are investigating the Mask's activity. To obtain the funds necessary to attend Tina's performance, Stanley dons the mask and robs the bank, inadvertently foiling Tyrell's robbery. At the Coco Bongo, Stanley dances exuberantly with Tina, whom he ends up kissing. Shortly after, Tyrell confronts him for disrupting the robbery and Stanley flees, leaving behind a scrap of cloth from his suit, which reverts into a piece of his pajamas. After arresting Tyrell and his henchman, Kellaway finds the piece of cloth and suspects Stanley's involvement.

Later, Stanley consults Doctor Arthur Neuman, a psychiatrist who has recently published a metaphorical book on masks, and deduces that the mask may be a creation of Loki, the Norse god of mischief, and its powers are only active at night. Though Neuman believes it is mythology, he concludes that the Mask's personality is based on Stanley's repressed desires. That night, Stanley meets Tina at a local park as the Mask, until they are interrupted by Kellaway, who attempts to capture him. Stanley flees with Peggy after he distracts the police with a mass performance of the titular song from Cuban Pete; she then betrays him to Tyrell for a $50,000 bounty. Tyrell dons the mask, becoming a bulky and demonic green-faced being. Tyrell's henchmen force Stanley to reveal the location of the stolen money before turning him in to the police.

When Tina visits Stanley in the station, he urges her to leave the city. Tina thanks Stanley for showing her kindness and tells him the mask was unnecessary. She attempts to flee but is kidnapped by Tyrell and forcibly taken to a charity ball at the Coco Bongo, hosted by Niko and attended by the city's elite, including the mayor. Upon arrival, the masked Tyrell kills Niko and prepares to destroy the club with a time bomb. Milo, Stanley's dog, helps Stanley escape from the station by retrieving the keys from the guard. Stanley sets out to stop Tyrell, taking Kellaway hostage.

After locking Kellaway in his car, Stanley enters the club and enlists Charlie's help, but is quickly discovered and captured. Tina tricks Tyrell into removing the mask, which is recovered and donned by Milo, who battles his way through Tyrell's henchmen as Stanley and Tyrell fight each other. Stanley retrieves the mask, uses its powers to swallow the bomb seconds before it detonates, and then flushes Tyrell down the drain of the club's ornamental fountain; the police arrive and arrest Tyrell's henchmen. Kellaway tries arresting Stanley again, but the mayor intervenes, implicating Tyrell as the Mask and praising Stanley as a hero.

The following day, Stanley, exonerated and more secure returns to the harbor bridge with Tina. Tina throws the mask into the water before she and Stanley share a kiss. Charlie tries to retrieve the mask for himself, only for Milo to swim away with it.

Cast 
 Jim Carrey as Stanley Ipkiss / The Mask: An everyday polite, nice, kind, down-on-his-luck bank employee who is mistreated and taken advantage of by people which Carrey commented that he characterized Stanley after his own father: "a nice guy, just trying to get by." When he wears the Mask, Stanley becomes a mischievous, green-faced figure known as The Mask who has the ability to animate and alter himself and his surroundings at will.
 Max as Milo, Stanley's Jack Russell Terrier. When wearing the Mask, Milo becomes quite aggressive and mischievous but is still friendly and loyal to his owner.
 Peter Greene as Dorian Tyrell, a rogue mafia officer who desires to overthrow his superior, Niko. He is psychopathic, manipulative, and arrogant. When wearing the Mask; acted by Garret T. Sato in make-up, Tyrell becomes a bulky and malevolent being that speaks in a deep demonic voice. 
 Cameron Diaz as Tina Carlyle, Tyrell's glamorous and beautiful girlfriend, is also attracted to Stanley. Tina is dissatisfied with Tyrell as a partner but does not defy him until Stanley has courted her.
 Orestes Matacena as Niko, Tyrell's superior and the owner of the Coco Bongo.
 Peter Riegert as Lieutenant Mitch Kellaway, A slightly cynical police detective lieutenant who pursues the Mask, Tyrell, and Stanley throughout the film.
 Jim Doughan as Detective Doyle, Kellaway's slightly inept partner.
 Richard Jeni as Charles "Charlie" Schumaker, Stanley's best friend. Charlie is amiable but can be selfish or irrational at times.
 Amy Yasbeck as Peggy Brandt, a reporter, looking for a scoop to get her out of the advice column. The character appeared in the animated series.
 Jeremy Roberts as Bobby, one of Tyrell's henchmen employed as the bouncer at the Coco Bongo. He is a friend of Charlie.
 Ben Stein as Dr. Arthur Neuman: A psychologist who tells Stanley about the mask being a creation of Loki. He is also the author of the book, The Masks We Wear, which deals with people portraying themselves differently on the outside to be accepted by others.
 Ivory Ocean as Mayor Tilton: The mayor of Edge City.
 Reg E. Cathey as Freeze, one of Tyrell's henchmen and a loyal friend of his.
 Denis Forest as Sweet Eddy, one of Tyrell's henchmen.
 Eamonn Roche as Mr. Dickey, Stanley and Charlie's supervisor at Edge City Bank.
 Nancy Fish as Agnes Peenman, Stanley's temperamental landlady.
 Nils Allen Stewart as Orlando, one of Tyrell's henchmen.
 Blake Clark as Murray, Peggy's supervisor at the city's local newspaper.
Joely Fisher as Maggie, a client who comes to buy concert tickets, and blows Stanley off for her friend. She appears only in the beginning of the film.

Production

Development 
In 1989, Mike Richardson and Todd Moyer, who was Executive Vice President of Dark Horse Comics, first approached New Line Cinema about adapting the comic The Mask into a film, after having seen other offers. The main character went through several transformations, and the project was stalled a couple of times.

One unused "Mask" idea, according to Mike Richardson, was to transform the story into one about a mask-maker who took faces off of corpses to put them on teens and turn them into zombies.

Initially intended to become a new horror franchise, New Line Cinema offered the job of directing the film to Chuck Russell. Russell found the violence of the comic to be off-putting and wanted the film to be less grim and adult-oriented and more fun and family-friendly than the source material.

Writing 
Mike Werb says Chuck Russell tapped him after reading his script for Curious George for Imagine. The two decided to turn The Mask into a wild romantic comedy. Mike Werb wrote his first draft of The Mask in less than six weeks, and less than two months later it was green-lit.

According to Mark Verheiden, they had a first draft screenplay for a film version done back in 1990. Verheiden then wrote the second draft in early 1991, adding more humor, and that ended up being the only work he did on The Mask. Veriheiden's revised draft included more instances of fourth wall breaking like "cameos" by critics Siskel and Ebert, and dark content such as excessive bloodshed and sexual assault. The characters Stanley, Kellaway, and Doyle carried into the final film; Stanley's girlfriend Kathleen (inspired by Kathy from the comics) evolved into Tina Carlyle while Scully and Vitelli became Dorian Tyrell and Niko, respectively. After that, the film entered development hell.

Casting 
In the early stages various actors were suggested as possibilities for the lead role, including Rick Moranis, Martin Short, and Robin Williams.
New Line executive Mike DeLuca sent a tape of Jim Carrey performing a sketch from the comedy show In Living Color to Richardson who was immediately impressed by the contortionist comedian. Director Chuck Russell had seen Carrey perform live at The Comedy Store and followed him on In Living Color and was keen to cast him in the film. Carrey was top of his list and the script had been rewritten for him but Nicolas Cage and Matthew Broderick were also kept in consideration. 

For producer Bob Engelman, it was a good lineup, since Carrey came to act sick. He recalls:

Russell had wanted Anna Nicole Smith as Tina, but she had gone to do Naked Gun 33 1/3: The Final Insult instead. A costume director he had worked with had been recommending Cameron Diaz and they got her to audition for the part. The character was originally written as a good girl who is actually bad but after Diaz was cast the part was rewritten to make her genuinely a good person. In fact, Mike Richardson (Dark Horse founder and Mask creator) said to Forbes that Diaz was great on making the movie. "If you watch the film again, you'll notice scenes where Jim and Cameron are together. If you watch her face, oftentimes, Jim was doing something, and she would break out laughing the minute the scene ended".

Visual effects 

The Masks visual effects were handled by Industrial Light & Magic (ILM) and Dream Quest Images. The sequences in the film which involved computer animation were supervised by ILM animation director Wes Takahashi. There were a lot of VFX scenes that had to be cut for budget. Make-up effects artist Greg Cannom realized Carrey's exaggerated facial expressions were part of his essence, and didn't want them lost behind makeup.

Music

Soundtrack 
Swing music featured prominently in the film, and Royal Crown Revue made an on-screen cameo, which in turn influenced the swing revival later in the decade.

The Mask: Music From the New Line Cinema Motion Picture was released on July 26, 1994, on Chaos Records through Sony Music Entertainment. It features music from Xscape, Tony! Toni! Toné!, Vanessa Williams, Harry Connick Jr., Carrey himself and more. The songs "Cuban Pete" and "Hey Pachuco" were also used for the trailer of the 1997 Disney film Flubber.

 "Cuban Pete" (C & C Pop Radio Edit) – Jim Carrey
 "Who's That Man?" – Xscape
 "This Business of Love" – Domino
 "Bounce Around" – Tony! Toni! Toné!
 "(I Could Only) Whisper Your Name" – Harry Connick Jr.
 "You Would Be My Baby" – Vanessa Williams
 "Hi De Ho" – K7
 "Let the Good Times Roll" – Fishbone
 "Straight Up" – The Brian Setzer Orchestra
 "Hey! Pachuco!" – Royal Crown Revue
 "Gee, Baby, Ain't I Good to You" – Susan Boyd
 "Cuban Pete" (Arkin Movie Mix) – Jim Carrey

Score 
The record labels TriStar Music and Epic Soundtrax released an orchestral score soundtrack to The Mask after the original soundtrack's release. The score was composed and conducted by Randy Edelman, performed by the Irish Film Orchestra, recorded at Windmill Lane Studios Ireland.

 Opening – The Origin of the Mask
 Tina
 Carnival
 Transformation
 Tango In The Park
 Lovebirds
 Out of the Line of Fire
 A Dark Night
 The Man Behind the Mask
 Dorian Gets a New Face
 Looking for a Way Out
 The Search
 Forked Tongue
 Milo to the Rescue
 The Mask Is Back
 Finale

Reception

Box office
The film was a box-office success, grossing $119 million domestically and over $350 million worldwide, becoming the second-highest grossing superhero movie at that time, behind Batman. In terms of global gross compared to budget, the film became the most-profitable comic book movie of all time, and remained so until 2019, when Joker surpassed it. The Mask is one of three films featuring Carrey (the others being Ace Ventura: Pet Detective and Dumb and Dumber) released in 1994 that helped launch the actor to superstardom; The Mask was the most successful of these three films both critically and commercially.

Critical response
On Rotten Tomatoes the film has a "Certified Fresh" approval rating of 80% based on reviews from 54 critics, with an average rating of 6.5/10. The site's consensus states: "It misses perhaps as often as it hits, but Jim Carrey's manic bombast, Cameron Diaz's blowsy appeal, and the film's overall cartoony bombast keep The Mask afloat." Metacritic gave it a weighted average score of 56 out of 100 based on reviews from 12 critics, indicating "mixed or average reviews". Audiences polled by CinemaScore gave the film an average grade of "B+" on an A+ to F scale.

On the television program At the Movies, Gene Siskel and Roger Ebert gave the film "two thumbs up". In his column, Ebert, who was underwhelmed by his performance in Ace Ventura, thought Carrey found "a perfect vehicle" in The Mask. He also praised the art design and called Diaz "a true discovery".

Accolades
The film was nominated for Best Visual Effects at the 67th Academy Awards, but lost to Forrest Gump. Carrey was nominated for a Golden Globe but also a Razzie Award (for "Worst New Star").

Year-end lists 
 Honorable mention – Betsy Pickle, Knoxville News-Sentinel
 Honorable mention – Dan Craft, The Pantagraph

Home media 

The film was released on VHS and Laserdisc on January 18, 1995 and on DVD on March 26, 1997. The VHS version included the Space Ghost Coast to Coast episode "The Mask", which featured interviews with Jim Carrey and Chuck Russell. It was later released on Blu-ray Disc on December 9, 2008. It was the most rented title in the UK for the year with 3.8 million rentals.

Other media

Animated series 

An animated television series, entitled The Mask: Animated Series, was made over 54 episodes from 1995 to 1997, with Rob Paulsen as Stanley Ipkiss, his alter-ego The Mask, and Neil Ross as Kellaway. Its final episode was a crossover with The Mask and another Jim Carrey character, Ace Ventura. This would later continue in an episode of the Ace Ventura: Pet Detective cartoon series.

Video game 
A video game based on the movie, also titled The Mask, was released for the Super Nintendo Entertainment System by Black Pearl Software.

Sequel

After the success of the original, a sequel film was planned, with magazine Nintendo Power offering readers a chance, via sweepstakes, to win a cameo role in the film. Carrey eventually bailed on the project, forcing, amongst other things, Nintendo Power to give the winner of the contest the equivalent cash value instead. A standalone sequel, Son of the Mask, featuring neither Carrey nor Diaz, was eventually released in 2005, but it was a critical and commercial failure upon release, and the franchise was put on hold indefinitely. The film is considered one of the worst films ever made.

On the possibility of a direct sequel to the 1994 film with Carrey reprising the role of Stanley Ipkiss and Diaz as Tina Carlyle, Mike Richardson said in a 2014 interview, "We've been talking about reviving The Mask, both in film and in comics. We've had a couple of false starts".

Notes

References

External links 
 Official Warner Bros. Site
 
 
 
 

1994 films
1994 fantasy films
1990s screwball comedy films
1990s superhero films
American fantasy comedy films
American screwball comedy films
American slapstick comedy films
American superhero films
Dark Horse Entertainment films
Films adapted into television shows
Films based on Dark Horse Comics
Films based on Norse mythology
Films directed by Chuck Russell
Films set in Pennsylvania
Films shot in Los Angeles
Live-action films based on comics
New Line Cinema films
The Mask (franchise)
Films about banking
1990s superhero comedy films
Films scored by Randy Edelman
1994 comedy films
1990s English-language films
1990s American films